Legacy High School may refer to:
Legacy High School (Arizona), also known as Wickenburg Christian Academy, in Wickenburg, Arizona
Legacy High School (Broomfield, Colorado) in Broomfield, Colorado
Legacy High School (North Dakota) in Bismarck, North Dakota
Legacy High School (North Las Vegas, Nevada) in North Las Vegas, Nevada
Legacy High School (Vancouver, Washington)
The Child School/Legacy High School in Roosevelt Island, New York
Mansfield Legacy High School in Mansfield, Texas (Dallas-Fort Worth Area)
Southwest Legacy High School in San Antonio, Texas